Gerald Michael Nolan Corbett DL (born 7 September 1951) is a businessman who was the chairman of the Marylebone Cricket Club (MCC). A businessman, over a long career he has been a director of thirteen public companies, seven of which he has chaired.  He is currently chairman of Segro plc, the FTSE 100 international industrial property logistics group.  He chaired Britvic plc for 12 years until September 2017.  Britvic plc is the international soft drink company whose brands include Robinsons squash, J2O, Tango, Fruit Shoot, Ballygowan water and is also a bottler for PepsiCo.  As chairman he led the flotation of Britvic in 2005. He was chairman of Betfair plc between 2012-16 when Betfair merged with Paddy Power plc to create Paddy Power Betfair.
 
He was chairman of Moneysupermarket.com plc between 2007 when he led the floatation until April 2014.  He chaired Towry, the wealth advisory business between 2012 and 2014 and was a non-executive director of Numis plc, the stockbroking and investment banking business based in the city from 2008.  He was chairman of Numis from 2014-17.

In 2005 he became Chairman of SSL International plc, the consumer healthcare group, whose major brands included Durex and Scholl, sold in over 50 countries.  In 2010 he negotiated the sale of SSL to Reckitt Benckiser for £2.5 billion, a gain of 400% on the share price 5 years previously.

He was Chairman of Action on Hearing Loss between 2007 and 2013 (formerly known as the Royal National Institute of the Deaf), the UK’s largest charity for the Deaf and Hard of Hearing.  He is Chairman of the Hertfordshire Community Foundation and has been a trustee since 2010.  He was chairman of St Albans Cathedral Music Trust 2010-16.  He Chairs the St Albans Cathedral Appeal, "Alban Britain's First Saint".  He was High Sheriff of Hertfordshire for 2010/11 and served on the Council of the Shrieval Association between 2008 and 2012.

David Freud described him in his book "Freud in the City" as "immensely approachable, a short and jovial figure, full of impromptu quips relayed to the accompaniment of short, barks of laughter".  He had an executive career which covered many years as a Finance Director (he was one of the longest serving members of the 100 Group of FTSE Finance Directors) prior to a controversial spell as Chief Executive of Railtrack, the infrastructure is part of the Tory Government’s Railway privatisation.

Early career
Corbett attended Tonbridge School, before studying history at Cambridge University, where he was a foundation scholar. After this, he attended London and Harvard business schools before joining Boston Consulting Group, which advises on corporate strategy, in the mid-70s. In 1982, he joined electrical retailer Dixons, where he became group Financial Controller and Corporate Finance Director.

He left after five years to be Group Finance Director at international building materials firm Redland. In 1993, he became Group Finance Director of Grand Metropolitan, the food and drink giant.

When "Grand Met" merged with Guinness to form Diageo, in summer 1997 he left and was appointed Chief Executive of Railtrack, which he left in November 2000.

Railtrack

Railtrack was the most controversial of the Conservative government privatisations. The railway was dismembered into over 100 different pieces of which by far the largest was Railtrack which owned and operated the infrastructure. 

In September 1997, three weeks after his appointment, a First Great Western express train from Swansea collided with a freight train at Southall, West London, killing seven passengers. Twenty-seven months later, in October 1999, another Intercity train collided with a commuter train near Paddington, killing 31 people. It was Britain's worst rail disaster in a decade.

Railtrack came under intense scrutiny from the regulator, Tom Winsor, who claimed Railtrack was pursuing a deliberate "culture of defiance" due to disagreements over failed punctuality improvement targets. Corbett, who became the mouthpiece of the privatised railway, was frequently on TV and Radio defending his company. A year before the crash, he stated that Paddington was the "best protected" station in the UK; prompting Lord Cullen - head of the public enquiry into the crash - to comment that Corbett's statement was "not only ill-considered, but ... demonstrated either a degree of complacency on the part of senior management or a desire to encourage undeserved confidence in what Railtrack had actually achieved".

A year after the Paddington crash, in October 2000, a train from London to Leeds derailed at Hatfield, resulting in four deaths. Corbett's resignation was initially rejected by the Railtrack board. Later on the same day, on the BBC news, Corbett identified the Railways problem as its fragmentation. The railway had been "ripped apart by privatisation". He urged the Government and regulators to "think the unthinkable". He eventually left with a compensation package estimated to be worth £1.3m in total (of which £900,000 was his accrued pension benefit).

Corbett was personified on the London stage in David Hare's "The Permanent Way" and in the television film "Derailed". These dramatisations showed the private tension beneath the public face and noted that Corbett had his own share of personal tragedy. His father was killed at an early age by a drunk driver in a car accident. Corbett is married to an artist. Together they have four children, and he himself is one of five brothers.

After Railtrack
In March 2001, he was back at the helm of another major company, Woolworths, appointed to oversee the demerger of Woolworths Group from Kingfisher.  Once the demerger was completed in August 2001, he remained on the board as Chairman until 2007.

In October 2003, he was appointed non-executive chairman of Health Club Holdings, the Holmes Place fitness clubs business, which he stepped down from the end of 2005 following his appointment as Chairman of soft drinks company Britvic, to oversee its flotation in December 2005 on the London Stock Exchange. Since flotation Britvic has expanded into Ireland, France, the USA, Brazil and India.  The market value is over three times that at flotation.

He has also been a non-executive director of Burmah-Castrol plc and the MEPC property group.

In July 2005, he was appointed as Chairman of SSL International, the company that manufactures and sells internationally Durex contraceptives and Scholl footwear and foot-care products.  In the five years 2005-2010, SSL's profits trebled as the business expanded into new countries. 

Between 2004 and 2010, he was a non-executive director of Greencore Group plc, the Irish food company headquartered in Dublin. He was Chairman of the Governors of Abbot's Hill School between 1997 and 2002 and has been a governor of Luton University. In 2010 he served as High Sheriff of Hertfordshire

In December 2014, it was announced that he will take over as Chairman of the Marylebone Cricket Club in September 2015. He also became a Deputy Lieutenant of Hertfordshire in 2015.

References 

1951 births
Alumni of London Business School
Alumni of Pembroke College, Cambridge
Boston Consulting Group people
British businesspeople
British public transport executives
Burmah-Castrol
Deputy Lieutenants of Hertfordshire
Harvard Business School alumni
High Sheriffs of Hertfordshire
Living people
People educated at Tonbridge School